The Charlestown Civil War Memorial, also known as the Soldiers' and Sailors' Monument, is an outdoor granite monument and sculpture by Martin Milmore, commemorating the men of Charlestown, Boston, who fought to preserve the Union during the American Civil War. The memorial is installed in the Training Field in Charlestown, in the U.S. state of Massachusetts.

Description and history
The memorial, executed in granite, was designed in 1871 and dedicated in 1872. The sculpture measures approximately 12 x 9 x 8 ft, and depicts three figures: an allegorical female representing Liberty, carrying laurel wreaths in both hands, standing over two men, one a sailor and the other a soldier. The sculptural group is mounted on a pedestal and a base measuring 18 x 13 x 13 ft.

The work was surveyed as part of the Smithsonian Institution's "Save Outdoor Sculpture!" program in 1993.

References

External links

 

1870s establishments in Massachusetts
1870s sculptures
Allegorical sculptures in the United States
Charlestown, Boston
Granite sculptures in Massachusetts
Military monuments and memorials in the United States
Monuments and memorials in Boston
Outdoor sculptures in Boston
Sculptures of men in Massachusetts
Sculptures of women in Massachusetts
Statues in Boston
Union (American Civil War) monuments and memorials in Massachusetts